Michael 'Mick' Dunlop (born 12 January 1957) was a Scottish footballer who played for Clyde, Dumbarton, Queen of the South and Stenhousemuir.

References

1957 births
Scottish footballers
Dumbarton F.C. players
Clyde F.C. players
Queen of the South F.C. players
Stenhousemuir F.C. players
Scottish Football League players
Living people
Association football forwards